Western Scottish Omnibuses Ltd, in Scotland, was a bus operating subsidiary of the Scottish Transport Group formed in June 1985 from Western SMT Company Ltd and operated until 1997, when it became Western Buses Ltd. This successor company is now a part of Stagecoach West Scotland.

Operation 
From its head office in Nursery Avenue, Kilmarnock, Western Scottish covered an operating area bounded by Ardrossan in the north, Glasgow to the east, the Firth of Clyde to the west and Carlisle to the south.

Western was the largest operator in south west Scotland and was responsible for local bus services in the towns of Kilmarnock, Ayr, Cumnock, Girvan, Stranraer and Dumfries as well as rural services, interurban connections and cross-border journeys into north west England. Depots were located in those towns, as well as Annan, Ardrossan, Carlisle (shared with Cumberland Motor Services) and Whithorn.  Vehicles were also 'outstationed' at Kirkcudbright, Lockerbie, Penpont and Sanquhar.  The company would eventually establish bases in Brodick, Isle of Arran and Dunoon, Argyll also.

Western Scottish also provided coaches for Scottish Citylink work, mainly from the south west of Scotland to Glasgow, Edinburgh, London and the south.

Though the northern portion of the former Western SMT's operating area, covering Inverclyde, Renfrewshire and the Isle of Bute, was ceded to a new company, Clydeside Scottish, in June 1985 (in order to prepare the Scottish Bus Group for deregulation in 1986 and eventual privatisation), Clydeside Scottish was remerged with Western in May 1989. Depots at Largs, Greenock, Paisley, Johnstone, Inchinnan, Rothesay and Thornliebank on the south side of Glasgow were added on the merger of the two companies.

History 
Though its predecessor company Western SMT had a much longer and more distinguished history, Western Scottish was a relatively short lived legal creation. The traditional, smart red and cream livery the vehicles wore gave way to a black, white and two-tone grey scheme shortly after the company was created. This livery was short lived, however, and a black, white and red scheme took over within a couple of years. Due to the length of time taken to repaint the fleet, for a number of years vehicles appeared in three distinct liveries.

Western suffered from heavy competition after deregulation, particularly around Kilmarnock and Ayr, which, as the heavier populated areas of its operating area, provided the firm with the bulk of its income. Keenan of Ayr, Carrick Coaches, Shuttle Buses and various smaller operators appeared, challenging and weakening the dominant operator.

In May 1989, Clydeside Scottish was remerged with Western, still under the legal name of Western Scottish Omnibuses Ltd. The aim of the merger was to strengthen the two weakened giants and thus make the company a more attractive proposition for potential buyers on the run up to privatisation. Clydeside Scottish had existed for less than five years, and Western's operating region now covered the same geographical area the former Western SMT did.  Though the former Clydeside Scottish operation continued to trade simply as 'Clydeside', the vehicles were given the Western black, white and red livery.

During this time, however, extremely heavy and sustained competition from a multitude of smaller operators in Greenock and Paisley continued to financially weaken the company.

Western Scottish was purchased by its management and employee in October 1991 for £1m, with an immediate onward sale of the Clydeside operations and their depots to their management and employees as Clydeside 2000 plc (with Luton & District taking a 24% stake). The depot at Largs was closed, and Rothesay depot remained with Western Scottish. The Ardrossan depot closed shortly afterward.

The newly privatised Western Scottish was successful in securing all the tendered services on the Isle of Arran, putting the future of the small Brodick-based operator Arran Transport in jeopardy and drawing howls of protest and criticism from locals and the local media.  However, Arran Transport managed to stay in business by competing against the larger operator on its home island, and also the neighbouring Isle of Bute. In its home town of Kilmarnock, Western faced increasing levels of competition, most notably from Clyde Coast Coaches Ltd of Ardrossan, and retaliated by offering a free service between Saltcoats and Largs, Clyde Coast's traditional route. In 1993, a small operation was established in Dunoon, when Western won one tendered local service. Two Dennis Dart vehicles were stationed there until two years later when further routes were won and a depot running around 15 buses was opened there.

Stagecoach Group took over in July 1994 for £6m, and the 'bus war' with Clyde Coast was soon ended. Trading as Stagecoach Western Scottish, the company adopted the corporate Stagecoach white with red, blue and orange stripes and began expanding. Arran Transport was purchased in October 1994, followed by the much larger A1 Service operation in January 1995 - adding some 80 vehicles and operations in north Ayrshire from a new depot in Ardrossan. Stagecoach responded fiercely to the competition in Western's operating area, and was banned by the Traffic Commissioner from operating on the Ayr to Dalmellington route due to predatory and uncompetitive action against competitor Carrick Coaches for a period of one year. For the period of this ban AA Buses, which would later be owned by Stagecoach, registered a new service for the one-year period, matching the service that Stagecoach Western was forced to withdraw.

Stagecoach was also forced to withdraw from a co-operative service run from Ayr to Greenock with Clyde Coast, Clydeside and AA Buses. A new operator, Ashton Coaches, had successfully pioneered the 585 Coastliner service from Ayr to Greenock. As this partially competed (though not directly) with services provided by Clyde Coast, Clydeside, AA Buses and Stagecoach Western Scottish, these operators provided two vehicles each, branded 535 Coastlink and using a similar green and white livery, and operated to the same timetable as the competition.

1995 also saw the purchase of the bus operations of Clyde Coast, and in June 1997 the bus operations of Dodds of Troon and AA Buses of Ayr were purchased, together with the bus operations of Shuttle Buses, adding services around Kilwinning, Irvine and Troon to the Western operation.  At that time, the head office was moved to Sandgate Bus Station in Ayr, and the company name changed to Western Buses Ltd in the process.

See also 
 Stagecoach West Scotland
 Stagecoach Group

References

External links 
 Stagecoach West Scotland website
 Stagecoach West Scotland Yahoo Group

Stagecoach Group
Defunct companies of Scotland
Former bus operators in Scotland
Transport in East Ayrshire
Transport in North Ayrshire
Transport in South Ayrshire
Transport in Dumfries and Galloway